"Sweet Freedom" is a song by Michael McDonald, and his last Top 10 hit on the Billboard Hot 100 chart. The single's music video directed by Leslie Libman featured McDonald, along with actors Billy Crystal and Gregory Hines, in the film Running Scared.

In addition to being featured on Running Scareds soundtrack, the song was featured on the 1986 re-release of McDonald's 1985 album No Lookin' Back.

The track peaked at #7 in the US, #12 in the UK, and #14 in Canada.

Credits
 Lead vocals – Michael McDonald 
 Backing vocals – Michael McDonald and Siedah Garrett
 Guitars – Paul Jackson Jr. and Michael Thompson
 Keyboards – Greg Phillinganes, Anthony Patler, Danny Sembello, Rod Temperton and Larry Williams
 Synthesizer – Larry Williams
 Synclavier – Wells Christie
 Horns – David Boruff, Chuck Findley, Gary Grant, Jerry Hey, Kim Hutchcroft, Bill Reichenbach and Larry Williams
 Arrangements – Rod Temperton
 Producers – Bruce Swedien, Rod Temperton and Dick Rudolph
 Recorded and mixed by Bruce Swedien at Westlake Audio (Los Angeles, CA)

Charts

Safri Duo version

In 2002, Danish electronic percussion duo Safri Duo, featuring Michael McDonald, covered the song. It was released in June as the fourth and final single from their debut album, Episode II.

Track listing
CD maxi
 "Sweet Freedom" (Radio Version) - 3:23	
 "Sweet Freedom" (Tillmann Uhrmacher Remix) - 7:35	
 "Sweet Freedom" (Jan Driver Vocal Mix) - 7:41	
 "Sweet Freedom" (Extended) - 5:09
UK CD Single (Enhanced)

Charts

In popular culture
 On June 21, 2010, the song was played in an episode of the British television talk show The 5 O'Clock Show.
 The song is the culmination of the storyline of the online video series Yacht Rock.
 The song was performed in a 1987 episode of the children's music series Kids Incorporated.

References

1986 singles
Michael McDonald (musician) songs
Songs written by Rod Temperton
1986 songs
MCA Records singles
Universal Records singles
Songs written for films